Ustrzyki Dolne is a town in south-eastern Poland, situated in the Subcarpathian Voivodeship (since 1999) close to the border with Ukraine. It is the capital of Bieszczady County, with 9,383 inhabitants (02.06.2009).

In existence since the 15th century, Ustrzyki received its city charter around 1727. During the First Partition of Poland, in 1772 it became part of the Habsburg monarchy where it remained until 1918. After the defeat of Austria-Hungary Ustrzyki became part of the newly independent Poland. Major growth of the Ustrzyki economy began in the 19th century, when a railway connection to Przemyśl and Sanok was built in 1872, and the exploitation of local oil fields began. Temporarily in the USSR after the Vistula–Oder Offensive in 1944–45, it became part of postwar Poland following the 1951 Polish-Soviet territorial exchange.

The word Dolne means Lower. There exists a village Ustrzyki Górne - Upper.

Timeline of history

1497, Foundation of Ustrzyki Dolne as a royal village in the district Przemyśl
1723, Old town is built. First Jews appear in the town
1772, Ustrzyki Dolne together with Galicia becomes part of the Austrian Empire
1800–1850, Ustrzyki Dolne is part of the district Sanok (Königreich Galizien)
1850–1918, Ustrzyki Dolne is part of the district Lisko
During World War I, Ustrzyki Dolne was occupied for six months by the Russian army and in 1918 for two months by Ukrainian troops.
1919–1939, Ustrzyki Dolne is part of the Lwów Voivodeship. On 1 January 1939 in city lived 4,300 residents (550 Ukrainians, 1,150 Polish people, 2,600 Jews).
1939 September, Occupation by German troops. 100 Jews are killed. Soon transferred to Soviet Union as part of the Molotov–Ribbentrop Pact
1939–1941, Soviet annexation. Part of the Drohobych Oblast
1941–1944, German occupation. The city is initially taken by Slovak troops and transferred under the German administration. Jewish population is killed in the town or deported to Belzec where they are immediately gassed.  Probably only ten or fewer of Ustrzyki Dolne's prewar Jewish population survived the war.
1944–1951, Soviet administration. Part of the Drohobych Oblast
1951–1974, As part of a land swap with the Soviet Union, Ustrzyki Dolne becomes Polish again and is part of the province Rzeszów.
1974–1998, Ustrzyki Dolne becomes part of the Krosno Voivodeship.
1998, Ustrzyki Dolne becomes part of the Subcarpathian Voivodeship (capital Rzeszów)

Points of interest

International relations

Twin towns — Sister cities
Ustrzyki Dolne is twinned with:
 Sambir, Ukraine
 Giraltovce, Slovakia
 Zamárdi, Hungary

References

Notes

Cities and towns in Podkarpackie Voivodeship
Bieszczady County
Kingdom of Galicia and Lodomeria
Lwów Voivodeship
1727 establishments in the Polish–Lithuanian Commonwealth
Holocaust locations in Poland
Populated places established in the 15th century